Colin Banks (16 January 1932 – 9 March 2002) was a British designer who co-founded Banks & Miles, designers and typographers, in London in 1958 with John Miles. Major clients of the partnership included the Consumers' Association, the Post Office, British Telecom and London Transport, for whom they redesigned Edward Johnston's famous "Underground Sans" typeface, as New Johnston.

Early life
Banks was born in Ruislip, England, and grew up in Margate. He went to Rochester and Maidstone schools of art (both became Kent Institute of Art & Design then eventually the University for the Creative Arts), and met John Miles at Maidstone.

Career
With John Miles, he was the Production Editor of Which?, and associated magazines, from 1964 to 1993.

Typography
Banks was an influential designer, and his Telecom (T) identity, created for British Telecommunications when it was instituted in 1981, spawned many imitators. Its replacement by Wolff Olins' BT "piper" was received with much derision in 1991. Banks received a prestigious RSA/BBC Design Award in 1990, for the paper-saving redesign of the UK's Phonebook. Miles and Banks designed the UK Post Office's distinctive "double-line" alphabet in 1972 and New Johnston, a revival of Edward Johnston's "Underground Sans", for London Transport. They also designed the logo of Lancaster University.

Banks was President of the International Society of Typographic Designers (ISTD) from 1988 to 1993 and 2000 to 2002.

Publications
His approach is described by David Jury in the book About Face: "For Banks, it was important to respect the spirit of Johnston rather than adhere mechanically to the construction rules which would have made any further development of the design impossible." Banks would later design a limited-edition book for the organisation as a tribute to Edward Johnston.

Personal life
He was married since 1961 to zoologist Dr Caroline Grigson (daughter of the poet Geoffrey Grigson and his first wife). They had a daughter, Frances, who was killed in a road accident in 1978, and a son, Joe.

Banks died of cancer in Blackheath, London, aged 70.

Notes

References 
 Banks's article "Pleasures of design" for Linotype, co-written with John Miles:
 John Miles, Design for Desktop Publishing, Chronicle Books, 1987. .
 Monty Shaw, Banks and Miles: Thirty Years of Design Evolution. London: Lund Humphries (February 1993), 
 David Jury, About Face, Reviving the Rules of Typography. Switzerland: Rotovision, Mies (pp. 60–61),

External links
 James Alexander, Colin Banks obituary, The Guardian, 4 April 2002.
 Jeremy Myerson, "Colin Banks", The Independent, 16 March 2002.
 TDC Archive
 MyFonts
 John Miles Biography
 London Transport Museum, archive artworks for New Johnston Typeface design 
 

1932 births
2002 deaths
People from Margate
English typographers and type designers
Royal Mail people
English graphic designers
Alumni of the University for the Creative Arts